Monts-de-Randon is a commune in the Lozère department in southern France. It was established on 1 January 2019 by merger of the former communes of Rieutort-de-Randon (the seat), Estables, Saint-Amans, Servières and La Villedieu.

See also
Communes of the Lozère department

References

Communes of Lozère
States and territories established in 2019